The North Galaxy Towers are twin 28-storey skyscrapers on the / in the Northern Quarter central business district of Brussels, Belgium. There is a third building in the complex which is 6 storeys tall. The first two floors are shared by all three buildings.

About  of the space below ground is used for archives. There are a total of 35 elevators in the complex.

The towers were originally conceived as part of an eight-building Brussels World Trade Center complex, but were splintered off into a separate project. The construction of the towers began in 2002 and ended in 2004.

The complex is being leased by the Belgian Federal Government. It houses the Federal Public Financial Service and other governmental bodies, with all three buildings used for administration and management.

See also

 Astro Tower
 Finance Tower
 Madou Plaza Tower
 Proximus Towers
 Rogier Tower
 World Trade Center (Brussels)

References

Buildings and structures in Brussels
Skyscraper office buildings in Belgium
Schaerbeek
Office buildings completed in 2004
Twin towers